Maple Grove Senior High School (MGSH) is a public grade 912 high school located in Maple Grove, Minnesota, United States. It is one of three high schools in the Osseo School District (279). Its feeder schools are Maple Grove Middle School and Osseo Middle School. The school has included grades 912 since September 2015. Previously grade 9 attended junior high school. MGSH contains students from the cities of Maple Grove, Corcoran, Dayton, Rogers, and Plymouth.

History
Maple Grove Senior High opened in 1996 as the third public high school built by the Osseo School District. MGSH is the only public high school located in Maple Grove, Minnesota, although the grounds of Osseo Senior High School are partially located within the boundaries of the city of Maple Grove. MGSH now includes grades 9-12 as of September 2015.

Curriculum
Around 200 courses are available at Maple Grove Senior High. Types of courses include Advanced Placement, Honors, traditional, remedial, and special education courses. Through the Minnesota state Post Secondary Enrollment Options (PSEO) program, students are eligible to take classes at state colleges and universities. PSEO participation counts towards graduation requirements. Maple Grove implemented standards-based grading in 2011. Maple Grove has been working on learning how to effectively implement standard based grading to help better prepare students for college in the last five years.

Demographics
The demographic breakdown of the 2,271 students enrolled in 2015-2016 was:
Male - 52.4%
Female - 47.6%
Native American/Alaskan - 0.1%
Asian/Pacific Islanders - 7.2%
Black - 7.2%
Hispanic - 3.6%
White - 78.8%
Multiracial - 3.1%
13.7% of the students were eligible for free or reduced cost lunch.

Athletics
The Maple Grove Crimsons are members of the Northwest Suburban Conference of the Minnesota State High School League. The school mascot is Leafy, a crimson and gold maple leaf.

The boys and girls hockey teams play out of the Maple Grove Community Center, a large recreational complex and a 1500-seat ice arena located in the city.

On December 2nd, 2022, Maple Grove's football team won their first-ever class 6A state championship title in a 27-10 victory over Rosemount. With this win, Maple Grove would also finish undefeated, at 14-0 on the season.

Extracurricular activities
Maple Grove Senior High School offers students the following clubs and organizations:

Anime & Sci Fi Club
Creative Writing Club
Crimson Guides
Debate Team
DECA
Green Club
Fellowship of Christian Athletes
Fishing Club
G.A.P. (Grove Area Percussion)
HOSA
Jazz Ensemble
Link Crew
Marching Crimson
Math Team
MG Rotary Club Camp Ryla (Rotary Youth Leadership Award)
MN American Legion Boys State American Legion Auxiliary Girls State
Mock Trial, Model United Nations
Musical Theatre
National Honor Society
News Paper
Pep Band
Crimson Robotics Team 2526 (FIRST Robotics Competition)
S.A.G.E. (Sexuality and Gender Equality)
Salon 161
Speech Team
Crimson Cabinet (Student Government)
Yearbook

Notable alumni
 Kayode Awosika  professional football player
 Brad Davison  American college basketball player, currently plays for Wisconsin Badgers
 Dakota Darsow  professional wrestler
 Jordan Gross  professional ice hockey player
 Jake Wieneke  professional football player

References

External links

Public high schools in Minnesota
Maple Grove, Minnesota
Educational institutions established in 1996
1996 establishments in Minnesota
Schools in Hennepin County, Minnesota